Peter Casey (6 August 1935 – 27 January 2018) was an Irish horse trainer.

He trained at Stamullen, County Meath. Casey bred Hello Bud, who was fifth in the Aintree Grand National in 2010.

Television outburst
In January 2012, Casey enjoyed his first Grade One success when  Flemenstar captured the Arkle Novice Chase at Leopardstown Racecourse. Following Flemenstar's victory he was interviewed on live television by RTÉ's Tracy Piggott. He shocked Piggott by declaring "It's unreal, I can't believe it". I'll have fecking sex tonight and everything." The incident swiftly became an internet sensation. Within one day a clip on YouTube received in the region of 130,000 hits In addition, it briefly trended on Twitter.

Personal life
Casey and his wife Junie celebrated their golden wedding anniversary during  Easter 2012.

Death
Casey died on 27 January 2018, aged 82.

References

Sportspeople from County Meath
Irish racehorse trainers
1935 births
Place of birth missing
2018 deaths
Place of death missing